Oreovec may refer to:
 Oreovec, Makedonski Brod, North Macedonia
 Oreovec, Prilep, North Macedonia